Kushi is a mountain located in Pakistan, and part of the Toba Kakar Range.

References

Hindu Kush
Mountains of Balochistan (Pakistan)
Two-thousanders of Pakistan